Lucha Libre USA: Masked Warriors premiered on MTV2 on July 16, 2010. It focused on professional wrestling matches, with commentary from multiple commentators including Todd Romero, Kevin Kelly and Stevie Richards. Video packages highlighting wrestlers or storylines, air throughout each broadcast as well as several interactions between either the wrestlers themselves or with storyline involved characters. In 2012 the series was aired on the streaming service Hulu.

As of 2012, 20 episodes of Lucha Libre USA: Masked Warriors have aired as well as one special episode.

Series overview

Special

Season 1 (2010)

Season 2 (2011–12)

See also

 List of Lucha Libre USA events

References

External links
 
 Lucha Libre USA official Facebook

Lists of American non-fiction television series episodes
Professional wrestling-related lists
Lucha Libre USA